Motherwell and Wishaw is a constituency of the Scottish Parliament (Holyrood) covering part of the council area of North Lanarkshire. It elects one Member of the Scottish Parliament (MSP) by the plurality (first past the post) method of election. It is also one of nine constituencies in the Central Scotland electoral region, which elects seven additional members, in addition to nine constituency MSPs, to produce a form of proportional representation for the region as a whole.

The seat has been held by Clare Adamson of the Scottish National Party since the 2016 Scottish Parliament election.

Electoral region 

The other eight constituencies of the Central Scotland region are Airdrie and Shotts, Coatbridge and Chryston, Cumbernauld and Kilsyth, East Kilbride, Falkirk East, Falkirk West, Hamilton, Larkhall and Stonehouse and Uddingston and Bellshill.

The region covers all of the Falkirk council area, all of the North Lanarkshire council area and part of the South Lanarkshire council area.

Constituency boundaries and council area 

The  constituency was created at the same time as the Scottish Parliament, in 1999, with the name and boundaries of an  existing Westminster constituency. In 2005, however, Scottish Westminster (House of Commons) constituencies were mostly replaced with new constituencies.

The Holyrood constituency is one of four covering the North Lanarkshire council area, the others being Airdrie and Shotts, Coatbridge and Chryston and Cumbernauld and Kilsyth; Uddingston and Bellshill spans parts of both North and South Lanarkshire. All five are within the Central Scotland electoral region.

The electoral wards used in the creation of Motherwell and Wishaw are listed below. All of these wards are part of North Lanarkshire.

In full:
Motherwell West
Motherwell South East and Ravenscraig
Murdostoun
Wishaw
In part:
Motherwell North (shared with Uddingston and Bellshill)

Member of the Scottish Parliament 
The seat had always elected Labour MSPs (until 2016), it was a safe Labour seat from 1999 until 2011. The MSP from 1999 was the former First Minister, Lord Jack McConnell. The MSP John Pentland won the seat on McConnell's retirement in 2011, but the national SNP landslide of that year turned it for the first time from safe Labour into a Labour-SNP marginal with just two percentage points separating Pentland and his nearest opponent, the SNP's Clare Adamson. Adamson defeated Pentland to gain the seat in 2016.

Election results

2021

2010s

2000s

1990s

Footnotes

External links

Constituencies of the Scottish Parliament
1999 establishments in Scotland
Constituencies established in 1999
Scottish Parliament constituencies and regions 1999–2011
Scottish Parliament constituencies and regions from 2011
Politics of North Lanarkshire
Motherwell
Wishaw